Wang Shu-hui (born 2 December 1955) is a former legislator for the Democratic Progressive Party in Taiwan.

Wang Shu-hui has on occasion participated in physical confrontations during her time as a Taiwanese legislator, including one incident involving a thrown shoe. In 2006, she literally ate up a transportation proposal on opening links with mainland China to prevent its being voted upon.

She was defeated by Lin Hung-chih of the Kuomintang for Taipei County constituency 6 in the 2008 legislative election.

Wang subsequently won election to the New Taipei City Council in 2010, 2014, and 2018. In January 2022, during her third term as city councilor, the New Taipei City District Court sentenced Wang to nine years imprisonment for fraud that had taken place during her first term in office. Wang was found to have listed relatives as members of her staff, then collected the wages and subsides set aside for them.

References

Democratic Progressive Party Members of the Legislative Yuan
National Taiwan University alumni
Fu Jen Catholic University alumni
21st-century Taiwanese women politicians
Living people
1955 births
New Taipei Members of the Legislative Yuan
Members of the 5th Legislative Yuan
Members of the 6th Legislative Yuan
New Taipei City Councilors
Women local politicians in Taiwan